Grandate is a comune (municipality) in the Province of Como in the Italian region Lombardy, located about  north of Milan and about  southwest of Como.

Grandate borders the following municipalities: Casnate con Bernate, Como, Luisago, Montano Lucino, Villa Guardia.

Twin towns — sister cities
Grandate is twinned with:

  Pocé-sur-Cisse, France

References

Cities and towns in Lombardy